Kuberbhai Mansukhbhai Dinor  is an Indian politician from Gujarat. He is an incumbent cabinet minister of Government of Gujarat.

Electoral history
He is an MLA from Santrampur in Mahisagar District. In 2017, he defeated incumbent mla Gendalbhai Damor by margin of just 6,424 votes and got 49.09% of total votes. Again he was fielded in 2022 Assembly election from the same seat and defeated Congress candidate Gendalbhai Damor by margin of 15,557 votes.

On 12 December 2022, he was inducted as Cabinet Minister in Second Bhupendrabhai Patel Ministry. Earlier in First Bhupendrabhai Patel ministry he was Minister of State.

References

Year of birth missing (living people)
Living people